Messines is a municipality in the Canadian province of Quebec. It includes the population centres of Messines and Farley.

Maniwaki Airport is located in Messines.

History
Settlement began in 1840, and the village came to be known as Burbidge or Burbridge by 1906, named after Deputy Minister of Justice George Wheelock Burbidge. Further development resulted from agriculture and forestry, and consolidation of the community, at the start of the 1900s, was thanks to the arrival of the railway, which for more than a century connected Hull (Gatineau) to Maniwaki. The Saint-Raphaël parish was legally constituted in 1906.

On August 19, 1921, the municipality was established when it separated from the Township Municipality of Bouchette. Although the new municipality was named after Messines, Belgium (in honour of the Canadians who fought there during World War I), it was misspelled as Messine (no "s") when incorporated. It was not until 1986 when this was officially corrected. The first municipal council was elected in 1921 with Louis Lécuyer as its first mayor.

In the middle of the 20th century, Messines was very active in growing potatoes thanks to its sandy soil, ideal for extensive exploitation of this staple. For many years, an important agricultural co-operative was formed between the local and regional farmers of the day. The original main building of the co-op today houses a sawmill. During the second half of the century, the municipality’s economy gradually changed to tourism and cottagers, thanks to the presence of its magnificent lakes. Some of the more popular ones are: Blue Sea Lake, Big Cedar and Little Cedar Lakes. There are also many forested areas which allow for outdoor activities throughout the year. Today, the municipality is also known for its hunting and fishing territories, and for a wide variety of recreational activities available all year long.

Demographics

Local government
List of former mayors:

Ronald Cross 2001–present
Normand St-Jacques 1997-2001
Ronald Cross 1993-1997
Marc Beaulieu 1987-1993
Joseph Mayer 1985-1987
Marcel Lévesque 1983-1985
Léo Lafontaine 1978-1983
Viateur Saumure 1977-1978
Jean-Louis Latourelle 1972-1977
Rolland Jolivette 1971-1972
Jean-Paul Dault 1968-1971
Rolland Jolivette 1965-1968
Oscar St-Jacques 1961-1965
Ludger Beaudoin 1953-1961
Alexandre Lafrenière 1951-1953
Oscar St-Jacques 1947-1951
Alexandre Lafrenière 1945-1947
Anastase Saumure 1943-1945
Frank Nault 1942-1943
Alexandre Lafrenière 1937-1941
Louis Lécuyer 1935-1937
Alexandre Lafrenière 1933-1935
Ernest Noël 1931-1933
Harmidas Latourelle 1929-1931
Louis Corbeil 1928-1929
Louis Lécuyer 1926-1927
Louis Corbeil 1923-1926
Louis Lécuyer 1921-1923

References

External links 

Municipalities in Quebec
Incorporated places in Outaouais